Paloma Pérez-Lago González (born 22 May 1967 in Ferrol) is a  Spanish model and television presenter.

References

External links

Official web site (in Spanish)

1967 births
Living people
People from Galicia (Spain)
People from Ferrol, Spain
Spanish television presenters
Spanish female models
Spanish women television presenters